Providence Township was a township in southeastern Pennsylvania, United States from 1729 until it was divided in 1805.  Initially the township was part of  Philadelphia County.  Then in 1784, Providence Township was in that portion of Philadelphia County that was split off to form Montgomery County.

History
Originally the land was a major part of William Penn's Manor of Gilberts. On 2 March 1729, the courts created Providence Township, although it was often referred to as New Providence.

On 12 November 1805, Providence Township was divided along the Perkiomen Creek into the townships of Upper Providence and Lower Providence .

References 

Townships in Montgomery County, Pennsylvania
1729 establishments in Pennsylvania